A Way of Life: Over Thirty Years of Blood, Sweat and Tears is an autobiographical book written by Reginald Kray describing his personal highs and lows throughout his 30 years inside the British prison system.  First published in hardback in 2000 by Sidgwick & Jackson and in paperback by Pan Books 2001.

Notes

External links
British Library (Integrated Catalogue)
The Biography Channel, The Krays
The Kray Kampaign
BBC: On This Day: 7 January 1965 Krays in custody over menace charge
Youtube: The Krays appearing in a BBC interview

2000 non-fiction books
Organized crime memoirs
Memoirs of imprisonment
Sidgwick & Jackson books